Daniel Abse CBE FRSL (22 September 1923 – 28 September 2014) was a Welsh poet and physician. His poetry won him many awards. As a medic, he worked in a chest clinic for over 30 years.

Early years
Abse was born in Cardiff, Wales, as the younger brother of the politician and reformer Leo Abse and the eminent psychoanalyst Wilfred Abse. Unusually for a middle-class Jewish boy, Dannie Abse attended St Illtyd's College, a working-class Catholic school in Splott. Abse studied medicine, first at the University of Wales College of Medicine and then at Westminster Hospital Medical School and King's College London.

Abse was a passionate supporter of Cardiff City football club. He first went to watch them play in 1934 and many of his writings refer to his experiences watching and lifelong love of the team known as "The Bluebirds".

Career as poet

Although best known as a poet, Abse worked in the medical field, and was a physician in a chest clinic for over thirty years. He received numerous literary awards and fellowships for his writing. In 1989, he received an honorary doctorate from the University of Wales.

His first volume of poetry, After Every Green Thing, was published in 1949. His autobiographic work, Ash on a Young Man's Sleeve, was published in 1954. He won the Welsh Arts Council Award in both 1971 and 1987, and the Cholmondeley Award in 1985. He was a Fellow of The Royal Society of Literature from 1983. In a foreword to Collected Poems 1948–1976, Abse noted that his poems are increasingly "rooted in actual experience," both domestic and professional, and many display a reconciliation between Jewish and Welsh themes and traditions.

Abse lived for several decades in the north-west area of London, mainly near Hampstead, where he had considerable ties. For several years he wrote a column for the local Hampstead and Highgate Express. These articles subsequently appeared in book form.

In 2005, his wife Joan was killed in a car accident, while Abse suffered a broken rib. His poetry collection, Running Late, was published in 2006, and The Presence, a memoir of the year after his wife died, was published in 2007; it won the 2008 Wales Book of the Year award. The book was later dramatised for BBC Radio 4. He was awarded the Roland Mathias prize for Running Late.

In 2009, Abse brought out a volume of collected poetry. In the same year, he received the Wilfred Owen Poetry Award. Abse was a judge for the inaugural 2010 Hippocrates Prize for Poetry and Medicine. Abse was appointed Commander of the Order of the British Empire (CBE) in the 2012 New Year Honours for services to poetry and literature.

Abse died on 28 September 2014, six days after his 91st birthday.

Books
After Every Green Thing, Hutchinson, 1948
Walking Under Water, Hutchinson, 1952
Fire in Heaven, Hutchinson, 1956
Mavericks: An Anthology, ed. with Howard Sergeant, Editions Poetry and Poverty, 1957
Tenants of the House: Poems 1951–1956, Hutchinson, 1957
Poems, Golders Green, Hutchinson, 1962
Poems! Dannie Abse: A Selection, Vista/Dufour, 1963
Modern European Verse, ed., Vista, 1964
Medicine on Trial, Aldus, 1967
Three Questor Plays, Scorpion, 1967
A Small Desperation, Hutchinson, 1968
Demo Sceptre, 1969
Selected Poems, Hutchinson, 1970
Modern Poets in Focus 1, ed., Corgi, 1971
Modern Poets in Focus 3, ed., Corgi, 1971
Thirteen Poets, ed., Poetry Book Society, 1972
Funland and Other Poems, Hutchinson, 1973
Modern Poets in Focus 5, ed., Corgi, 1973
The Dogs of Pavlov, Vallentine, Mitchell, 1973
A Poet in the Family, Hutchinson, 1974
Penguin Modern Poets 26, with Dannie Abse, D. J. Enright and Michael Longley, Penguin, 1975
Collected Poems 1948–1976, Hutchinson, 1977
More Words, BBC, 1977
My Medical School, Robson, 1978
Pythagoras, Hutchinson, 1979
Way Out in the Centre, Hutchinson, 1981
A Strong Dose of Myself, Hutchinson, 1983
One-legged on ice: poems, University of Georgia Press, 1983
Doctors and Patients ed., Oxford University Press, 1984
Ask the Bloody Horse, Hutchinson, 1986
Journals From the Ant Heap, Hutchinson, 1986
Voices in the Gallery: Poems and Pictures, ed. with Joan Abse, Tate Gallery, 1986
The Music Lover's Literary Companion, ed. with Joan Abse, Robson, 1988
The Hutchinson Book of Post-War British Poetry, ed.,  Hutchinson, 1989
White Coat, Purple Coat: Collected Poems 1948–1988, Hutchinson, 1989
People, contributor, National Language Unit of Wales, 1990
Remembrance of Crimes Past: Poems 1986–1989, Hutchinson, 1990
The View from Row G: Three Plays, Seren, 1990
Intermittent Journals, Seren, 1994
On the Evening Road, Hutchinson, 1994
Selected Poems, Penguin, 1994
The Gregory Anthology 1991–1993, ed. with A. Stevenson, Sinclair-Stevenson, 1994
Twentieth-Century Anglo-Welsh Poetry, ed., Seren, 1997
Welsh Retrospective, Seren, 1997
Arcadia, One Mile, Hutchinson, 1998
Be seated, thou: poems 1989–1998, Sheep Meadow Press, 1999
Encounters Hearing Eye, 2001
Goodbye, Twentieth Century: An Autobiography, Pimlico, 2001
New and Collected Poems, Hutchinson, 2002
The Two Roads Taken: A Prose Miscellany, Enitharmon Press, 2003
Yellow Bird, Sheep Meadow Press, 2004
Running Late, Hutchinson, 2006
100 Great Poems of Love and Lust: Homage to Eros, compiler/ed., Robson, 2007
The Presence, Hutchinson, 2007
New Selected Poems 1949–2009: Anniversary Collection, Hutchinson, 2009 (shortlisted for Ted Hughes Award for New Work in Poetry)
Speak, Old Parrot, Hutchinson, 2013
Ask the Moon: New and collected poems 1948–2014, Hutchinson, 2014

Fiction
Ash on a Young Man's Sleeve, Hutchinson, 1954
Some Corner of an English Field, Hutchinson, 1956
O Jones, O Jones, Hutchinson, 1970
There Was A Young Man From Cardiff, Hutchinson, 1991
The Strange Case of Dr Simmonds & Dr Glas, Robson, 2002

Plays
Fire in Heaven (produced London, 1948), retitled Is the House Shut (1964) and In the Cage (1967)
Hands Around the Wall (produced London, 1950)
House of Cowards (produced London, 1960)
The Eccentric (produced London, 1961)
Gone (produced London, 1962)
The Joker (produced, London, 1962), retitled The Courting of Essie Glass (1981)
The Dogs of Pavlov (produced London, 1969)
Funland (produced London, 1975)
Pythagoras (produced Birmingham, 1976), retitled Pythagoras (Smith)

Published plays
 – includes House of Cowards, Gone and In the Cage
 – includes House of Cowards, The Dogs of Pavlov and Pythagoras (Smith)

Radio plays
Conform or Die (1957)
No Telegrams, No Thunder (1962)
You Can't Say Hello to Anybody (1964)
A Small Explosion (1964)
The Courting of Elsie Glass (1975)

References

Further reading

External links

Annotations at NYU Literature, Arts, and Medicine Database of several Abse works, with links to texts and audio of the poet reading poems " Carnal Knowledge", "Case History", "The Origin of Music", "Pathology of Colours", "The Stethoscope".
"Dannie Abse", Fellows Remembered, The Royal Society of Literature
Dannie Abse Papers at the Stuart A. Rose Manuscript, Archives, and Rare Book Library

1923 births
Anglo-Welsh poets
20th-century Welsh poets
21st-century Welsh poets
20th-century British poets
Fellows of the Royal Society of Literature
Jewish poets
Alumni of King's College London
Fellows of King's College London
Alumni of the University of Wales
20th-century Welsh medical doctors
2014 deaths
Writers from Cardiff
Welsh Jews
Commanders of the Order of the British Empire
Dannie
Presidents of the Poetry Society